Antibe Therapeutics is a Toronto-based pharmaceutical company that develops pain and inflammation-reducing drugs based on gaseous mediator technology.  Antibe was founded by John L. Wallace, also a co-founder of NicOx, the first company to develop drugs utilizing gaseous mediators. Founded in 2009, the company listed on the TSX Venture Exchange in 2013 and was moved to the Toronto Stock Exchange in November 2020. In 2015, Antibe acquired Citagenix, a distributor involved in regenerative medicine. On June 1, 2020, the company announced positive results in the final Phase 2 trial of its first drug.

Products

The mechanism of action of Antibe's drugs is the delivery of minute amounts of hydrogen sulfide to sites of inflammation within the human body.  Hydrogen sulfide has been shown to enhance the resolution of injury and repair of damage arising from tissue inflammation.  Antibe's lead drug, otenaproxesul or ATB-346, is a hydrogen sulfide-releasing derivative of naproxen, a commonly used non-steroidal anti-inflammatory drug (NSAID). ATB-346 is being developed to address osteoarthritis, although Antibe intends to broaden its application to other types of chronic pain and diseases now treated with NSAIDs. Unlike standard naproxen, ATB-346 does not induce damage to the gastrointestinal tract.
 
In May 2014, the company announced that it had completed pre-clinical studies on ATB-346. In late June 2014, following approval from Health Canada, the company announced the first human dosing for Phase I of its human clinical trials. In mid-January 2015, the company announced that clinical trials for its ATB-346 were being suspended due to safety concerns; clinical trials were restarted in March 2015.

On March 20, 2018, Antibe Therapeutics announced successful results for Phase 2B gastrointestinal safety study for  ATB-346. On June 1, 2020, Antibe announced positive results for ATB-346 (now known by its International Nonproprietary Name, otenaproxesul) in its final Phase 2 trial, a dose ranging, efficacy study. The company's second drug, an opioid-replacement for post-surgical pain, is expected to start clinical trials in late 2021.

On November 12, 2020, Antibe Therapeutics has moved to the TSX. In February 2021, Antibe announced a deal with Nuance Pharma, a Chinese pharmaceutical company, entitling them to $100 million in funding, with $20 million upfront.

Antibe's products have not yet been approved by the US Food and Drug Administration.

People

Antibe's science advisory board:
Andre G. Buret, Professor, University of Calgary, Canada
Giuseppe Cirino, PhD, Professor, University of Naples, Italy
Gilberto de Nucci, MD, PhD, Professor, University of Sao Paulo, Brazil
Peter B. Ernst, DVM, PhD, Professor, UCSD, San Diego, USA
Derek Gilroy, PhD, Professor, University College, London, UK
Richard H. Hunt, MD, Emeritus Professor, McMaster University, Canada
Louis Ignarro, PhD Professor, UCLA, Los Angeles, USA - 1998 Nobel Prize Laureate in Medicine
Daniel K. Podolsky, MD, President, University of Texas Southwestern Medical Center, USA
William Sessa, PhD, Professor, Yale University, USA
Philip M. Sherman, MD, Professor, University of Toronto, Canada

Antibe's board of directors:
Chair - Walt Macnee, Vice Chair, MasterCard International
Roderick Flower, Professor Emeritus, Barts and The London School of Medicine and Dentistry
Dan Legault, CEO, Antibe Therapeutics
Robert Hoffman, former CFO, Heron Therapeutics; Director, public biotechnology companies
Amal Khouri, VP Business Development, Knight Therapeutics
Jennifer McNealey, VP Investor Relations and Strategy, Calithera Biosciences
John L. Wallace, Chief Scientific Officer, Antibe Therapeutics
Yung Wu, CEO, MaRS Discovery District

References

External links

 Biotechnology Focus: The Need for a Safer NSAID: Can Antibe Therapeutics Deliver One? 
 Third International Conference on Medical & Biological Uses of Hydrogen Sulfide Third International Conference on Hydrogen Sulfide in Biology and Medicine (H2S 2014)

Drug discovery companies
Pharmaceutical companies of Canada
Companies listed on the Toronto Stock Exchange
Companies formerly listed on the TSX Venture Exchange